Dione (or δῖος dîos, which means 'divine one') is the name of four women in ancient Greek mythology, and one in the Phoenician religion described by Sanchuniathon. Dione is translated as "Goddess", and given the same etymological derivation as the names Zeus, Diana, et al. Very little information exists about these nymphs or goddesses, although at least one is described as beautiful and is sometimes associated with water or the sea. Perhaps this same one was worshiped as a mother goddess who presided over the oracle at Dodona, Greece and was called the mother of Aphrodite.

One Dione is identified as the mother of the Roman goddess of love, Venus, or equivalently as the mother of the Greek goddess of love, Aphrodite; but Dione is also sometimes identified with Aphrodite.

Titaness/Oceanid

Dione is among the Titanides or Titanesses. She is called a daughter of Oceanus and Tethys, hence an Oceanid, a water-nymph. She is otherwise called a daughter of Gaia; according to worshippers of Orpheus her father is the sky-god Uranus, while others identify her father as Aether. She and Zeus are called the parents of Aphrodite by some ancient sources. Hesiod listed Dione among the wives of Zeus who were daughters of Tethys and Oceanus; she is described as beautiful in the "sacred books of Orpheus". She was one of the goddesses assembled to witness the birth of Apollo.

The Greek goddess of love sometimes takes the name Dione: this may identify her with Aphrodite, though Homer calls Dione the mother of Aphrodite. Károly Kerényi notes in this context that the name Dione resembles the Latin name Diana, and is a feminine form of the name Zeus (cf Latin deus, god), hence meaning "goddess of the bright sky". This association does not prevent her, however, from being worshipped along with Zeus as a deity of springs, making her a water-goddess.

Nymph or sea-nymph
One of the Hyades, the rain-bringing nymphs, is Dione, the daughter of Atlas and an Oceanid nymph (either Pleione or Aethra); she married king Tantalus and bore him sons Pelops and Broteas, and a daughter, Niobe.

Among the 50 Mediterranean sea-nymphs called the Nereides was one Dione, like the others a daughter of Nereus and Doris.

Phoenician goddess
In the Phoenician History, a literary work attributed to Sanchuniathon, a daughter of Uranus/Heaven and Gaia/Earth is called Dione and also Baaltis. She is a sister of Kronos/Elus whom the latter made his wife after their father sent her, and her sisters, to kill Kronos/Elus. The latter gave the city Byblos to Dione. The exact identity of this Dione is uncertain: Sanchuniathon may have meant to identify her with Dione the Titaness. From her name Baaltis and association with Byblos she is taken to be Ba‘alat Gebal, the patron goddess of Byblos. However, some scholars identify her with Asherah, proposing that Sanchuniathon merely uses Dione as a translation of Asherah's epithet Elat.

Notes

References

 Apollodorus, The Library with an English Translation by Sir James George Frazer, F.B.A., F.R.S. in 2 Volumes, Cambridge, MA, Harvard University Press; London, William Heinemann Ltd. 1921. ISBN 0-674-99135-4. Online version at the Perseus Digital Library. Greek text available from the same website.
Gaius Julius Hyginus, Fabulae from The Myths of Hyginus translated and edited by Mary Grant. University of Kansas Publications in Humanistic Studies. Online version at the Topos Text Project.

 

Oceanids
Nereids
Phoenician mythology
Asherah